Joshua Tuasulia (born June 14, 1988) is a Solomon Islands footballer who plays as a defender for Marist. He also made two appearances for the Solomon Islands national team in 2012.

Playing career
He played with Suva in the Fijian National Football League in 2010. His lone goal that year came on 16 May in a 3–0 win over Rewa. He spent the 2011 season with Navua, also in Fiji. From there, he signed with Marist in his native country.

International career
Tuasulia was called up by the Solomon Islands national team ahead of the 2012 OFC Nations Cup. At the tournament, he made his senior international debut during a 1–1 group stage draw with New Zealand on 6 June 2012, coming on as a 39th minute substitute for an injured Freddie Kini. He earned his second cap a few days later, appearing as a member of the starting lineup in the third-place match, also against New Zealand.

National team statistics

Honours

Club
Marist
 Telekom S-League: 2016

References

External links
 
 
 
 
 

Living people
1988 births
Solomon Islands footballers
Association football defenders
Suva F.C. players
Navua F.C. players
Marist F.C. players
Solomon Islands international footballers
Solomon Islands expatriate footballers
Expatriate footballers in Fiji
Solomon Islands expatriate sportspeople in Fiji
2012 OFC Nations Cup players